Virginia Mennonite Conference is a body of Mennonite churches in the south-Atlantic region of the United States, consisting of Virginia, North Carolina, West Virginia, Tennessee and Kentucky and the city of Washington, D.C. There are 67 congregations in the Conference, and a number of congregations in formation without full membership status. As one of the regional Conferences of Mennonite Church USA, the congregations belong to nine Districts: Calvary, Central, Eastern (VA), Eastern Carolina, Harrisonburg, Northern, Potomac, Southern, and Tennessee/Carolina/Kentucky.

History 
The first meeting at which minutes were taken and preserved, of what would be later be incorporated as Virginia Mennonite Conference, took place in 1835 at Weavers Mennonite Church, near Harrisonburg, Virginia. It is thought that perhaps Virginia Mennonites met in even earlier gatherings.

In 1955, Pilgrim Mennonite Church of Amelia, Virginia, withdrew from Conference and helped begin what are known as the Nationwide Fellowship Churches. See Conservative Mennonites. Later, the Southeastern Mennonite Conference officially began their withdrawal from Virginia Mennonite Conference in June 1972.

Organization and commissions 
Virginia Mennonite Conference is overseen by Conference Council, an appointed group that makes larger decisions about the work of the Conference, appoints overseers for the different districts and commissions, and through the Faith & Life Commission, credentials ministers. Congregations appoint delegates to represent them at two meetings a years to discern issues and vote on resolutions.

Within the Conference structure are two Commissions that work on specific foci. The Congregational Life Commission "provides vision for new expressions of Anabaptism, provides the means for congregations, conference-related programs and institutions to communicate and network their ministries, and provides educational resources for congregations to nurture the spiritual formation of their members throughout the life cycle," according to a list of Commission duties.

The Faith and Life Commission strives to "provide leadership for Conference in spiritual, doctrinal, and faith and life issues, be a forum for interchanging concerns relating to congregational life and leadership, attend to leadership needs of congregations, promote unity of faith and practice, issue ministry credentials, and provide professional development, fellowship and inspiration for pastors," according to its list of duties.

Controversy 
Virginia Mennonite Conference was in the center of controversy in 2016 when it suspended a pastor in one of its member churches for performing a wedding ceremony between two women. Pastor Isaac Villegas from Chapel Hill Mennonite Fellowship married the women in May 2016 with the approval of his congregation, and his ministerial license was quickly suspended by VMC with a charge of pastoral misconduct. This decision acted against a church-wide forbearance resolution passed in 2015 by Mennonite Church USA, the denominational body that oversees Virginia Mennonite Conference. Virginia Mennonite's actions were covered in national news outlets, and numerous commentaries and editorials were published in national and Mennonite media sources.

Conference commissions and ministries 
 Congregational Life Commission
 Faith & Life Commission
 Historical Committee
 Virginia Mennonite Missions
 Congregational Resource Center
 Eastern Mennonite School

Conference endorsed ministries 
 Eastern Mennonite Seminary
 Eastern Mennonite University
 Family Life Resource Center
 Mennonite Women of Virginia
 Pleasant View, Inc.
 Virginia Mennonite Retirement Community
 Gift and Thrift, Inc.
 Highland Retreat
 Mennonite Disaster Service
 Mennowood Retirement Community
 NewBridges Immigrant Resource Center
 Roberta Webb Child Care Center
 Valley Brethren-Mennonite Heritage Center
 Virginia Mennonite Relief Sale
 Williamsburg Christian Retreat Center

Newsletter 
Virginia Mennonite Conference publishes a monthly newsletter Connections in conjunction with Virginia Mennonite Missions.

References

External links 
 

Mennonite denominations
Mennonitism in the United States
Mennonite Conference
Religious organizations established in 1835
Mennonite Church USA
1835 establishments in Virginia